"Turn the Page" is a song originally recorded by Bob Seger in 1971 and released on his Back in '72 album in 1973. It was not released as a single until Seger's live version of the song on the 1976 Live Bullet album got released in Germany and the UK. The song became a mainstay of album-oriented rock radio stations, and still gets significant airplay on classic rock stations.

Inspiration
"Turn the Page" is about the emotional and social ups and downs of a rock musician's life on the road. Seger wrote it in 1972 while touring with Teegarden & Van Winkle. Drummer David Teegarden (of Teegarden & Van Winkle and later the Silver Bullet Band) recalls: We had been playing somewhere in the Midwest, or the northern reaches, on our way to North or South Dakota. [Guitarist] Mike Bruce was with us. We'd been traveling all night from the Detroit area to make this gig, driving in this blinding snowstorm. It was probably 3 in the morning. Mike decided it was time to get gas. He was slowing down to exit the interstate and spied a truck stop. We all had very long hair back then – it was the hippie era – but Skip, Mike and Bob had all stuffed their hair up in their hats. You had to be careful out on the road like that, because you'd get ostracized. When I walked in, there was this gauntlet of truckers making comments – "Is that a girl or man?" I was seething; those guys were laughing their asses off, a big funny joke. That next night, after we played our gig – I think it was Mitchell, S.D. – Seger says, "Hey, I've been working on this song for a bit, I've got this new line for it. He played it on acoustic guitar, and there was that line: "Oh, the same old cliches / 'Is that a woman or a man?' " It was "Turn the Page."
Tom Weschler, then road manager for Seger, remembers the same incident: "Turn the Page," Bob's great road song, came along in '72, while we were driving home from a gig. I think we were in Dubuque, Iowa, in winter and stopped at a restaurant. We stood out when we entered a store or a gas station or a restaurant en masse. At this restaurant it was particularly bright inside, so there weren't any dark corners to hide in. All these local guys were looking at us like, "What are these guys? Is that a woman or a man?" – just like in the song. ... That was one incident, but there were so many others on the road that led Seger to write that song.

Seger said of the song:
While on tour in Milwaukee, Wisconsin, on November 16, 2006, promoting his 16th studio album Face the Promise, Seger said he wrote the song in  a hotel room in Eau Claire, Wisconsin.

Instrumentation
Both Seger's studio and live versions of "Turn the Page" feature a Mellotron and a saxophone part played by founding Silver Bullet member Alto Reed. Tom Weschler allegedly helped inspire Reed to create the opening melody. During recording, Weschler told Reed: "Alto, think about it like this: You're in New York City, on the Bowery.  It's 3 a.m. You're under a streetlamp. There's a light mist coming down. You're all by yourself. Show me what that sounds like." With that, Reed played the opening melody to "Turn the Page".

Personnel on live  recording
Credits are adapted from the liner notes of Seger's 1994 Greatest Hits compilation.
Bob Seger – lead vocals, electric piano

The Silver Bullet Band
Drew Abbott – guitar
Chris Campbell – bass
Charlie Allen Martin – drums
Alto Reed – saxophone
Robyn Robbins – Mellotron

Reception
Classic Rock History critic Janey Roberts rated it as Seger's 3rd best song, saying that it "featured one of the most memorable saxophone lines in rock and roll history" and that "'The same old cliches, is that a woman or a man?' is easily one of his most haunting lyrics."

Certifications

Jon English cover
Australian singer Jon English released a version of the song in 1974 as the lead single from his second studio album, It's All a Game. The song peaked at number 20 on the Kent Music Report.

Metallica cover

American heavy metal band Metallica released a version of the song as the first single from their 1998 Garage Inc. album. The song reached number 1 on the Billboard Hot Mainstream Rock Tracks chart for 11 consecutive weeks, the highest number of weeks Metallica has ever spent at the top until tied with Lux Aeterna in 2022; the song also reached number 2 on the Billboard Bubbling Under Hot 100. Drummer Lars Ulrich had heard the original song while driving across the Golden Gate Bridge and later commented that he thought it "had [Metallica frontman]  James Hetfield all over it". Metallica's rendition is taken at much the same tempo as Seger's, but with a heavier feel; the saxophone melody is replaced by a high slide guitar line from Kirk Hammett. The accompanying music video explores a day in the life not of musicians, but a single mother (played by Ginger Lynn) who is a sex worker; that is, she works as a stripper by day, and a prostitute by night. MTV refused to air the video due to nudity and a scene depicting sexual assault between the mother and a client. The video was directed by Jonas Åkerlund.

Seger's thoughts
When asked about his thoughts on this version, Seger told Artisan News, "I loved it. They told me they were gonna do it, and I loved it. I really like the drums especially because our drums are really simple."

Charts

Weekly charts

Year-end charts

Certifications

Influences

before performing the song with Seger at CMT Crossroads, Jason Aldean said "it was a song I used to always sing" when playing nightclubs & bars at 14, 15 years old, even though he didn't really know "what the hell it meant." After stating it had a whole new meaning for him 20-something years later, he added "it's always been one of my favorite songs of all time by any singer."

Jon Bon Jovi has claimed that the song was a big influence on him and Richie Sambora when they were writing their 1986 song "Wanted Dead or Alive".

Awards
The video of the performance with Aldean won the CMT Music Award for Performance of the Year.

References

External links
 "Reason to Rock" review

1970s ballads
1973 songs
1976 singles
1998 singles
Bob Seger songs
Jon English songs
Capitol Records singles
Elektra Records singles
Metallica songs
Songs written by Bob Seger
Rock ballads
Music videos directed by Jonas Åkerlund
Song recordings produced by Bob Seger
Song recordings produced by Punch Andrews